Here is a list of Arizona's congressional districts by their Human Development Index.

Very high

1. Arizona's 5th congressional district - 0.937

2. Arizona's 6th congressional district - 0.936

3. Arizona's 3rd congressional district - 0.928

 Arizona state average - 0.928

4. Arizona's 8th congressional district - 0.927

5. Arizona's 2nd congressional district - 0.920

High

6. Arizona's 1st congressional district - 0.898

7. Arizona's 7th congressional district - 0.895

8. Arizona's 4th congressional district - 0.868

References

Measureofamerica.org: Arizona Congressional Districts

Congressional Districts by HDI